Virginio Fasan (F 591) is a Carlo Bergamini-class frigate of the Italian Navy. Which in turn were developed by the FREMM multipurpose frigate program.

Development and design 
Planning assumptions for the Italian Navy are 10 FREMM-IT (4 ASW variants and 6 GP variants) at a cost of €5.9 billion. In the 2013 Italian budget, the Italian government laid out the necessary financing for two more GP variants (FREMM-IT 7 & 8) and the contract was awarded in September 2013. On 15 April 2015, the Italian Parliament confirmed the deal between OCCAR and Orizzonte Sistemi Navali Spa (Fincantieri and Finmeccanica, since 2017 Leonardo) to begin building units 9 and 10, for 764 million Euros.

As of 16 April 2015, the Italian government has approved funding for all ten FREMM-IT to be delivered to the Italian Navy (4 ASW variants and 6 GP variants).

FREMM-IT 9 & 10 will have undisclosed enhanced capabilities. All 10 Italian FREMM-ITs have extended AAW capabilities, with SAAM-ESD CMS, Aster 30 and Aster 15 missiles for extended area defence. SAAM-ESD CMS use Leonardo MFRA, a 3D active radar (AESA), an evolved version of the Leonardo EMPAR PESA radar (previously embarked on Horizon-class destroyers and the aircraft carrier Cavour). Since the 7th FREMM-IT, there will be updates, such as new conformal IFF antenna and much more stealth response. Since the 9th FREMM-IT, SCLAR-H replaced with Leonardo ODLS-20. In 2017 the Italian FREMM refit started with the installation on each of 2 SITEP MS-424 acoustic guns.

In 2020 it was reported that Italy would sell its last two FREMM-class frigates in the current production line (Spartaco Schergat and Emilio Bianchi) to Eqypt. Spartaco Schergat was in the final stage of her sea trials while Emilio Bianchi would follow within one year. The deal reportedly also involved other military equipment and was worth 1.2 billion Euros. It was reported that Italy would then order two additional FREMM frigates to replace those transferred to Egypt with the anticipated delivery of the replacements by 2024.

Construction and career 
On 31 March 2012, the launching ceremony of the ship took place at the Fincantieri plants in La Spezia, in the presence of the Chief of Defense, General Biagio Abrate, of the Chief of Staff of the Navy team admiral Bruno Branciforte, and the CEO of Fincantieri Giuseppe Bono. The ship christening was conducted by Mrs. Gina Fasan, daughter of Non-commissioned officer Virginio Fasan to whom the ship is named after.

Gallery

References

External links
 Fasan (F 591) Marina Militare website

Ships built by Fincantieri
2012 ships
Ships built in Italy
Bergamini-class frigates (2011)